aMatikulu is a settlement in Uthungulu District Municipality in the KwaZulu-Natal province of South Africa.

Town some 130 km north-east of Durban, near Gingindlovu. Named after the Matigulu, also spelt Amatikulu, River. From Lala or Zulu, probably "large water", i.e. "large river". The approved form is aMatikulu.

References

Populated places in the uMlalazi Local Municipality